is the capital city of Chiba Prefecture, Japan. The city became a government-designated city in 1992. In June 2019, its population was 979,768, with a population density of 3,605 people per km2.

Chiba City is one of the Kantō region's primary seaports, and is home to Chiba Port, which handles one of the highest volumes of cargo in Japan. Much of the city is residential, although there are many factories and warehouses along the coast. There are several major urban centres in the city, including Makuhari, a prime waterfront business district in which Makuhari Messe is located, and Central Chiba, in which the prefectural government office and the city hall are located.

Chiba is famous for the Chiba Urban Monorail, the longest suspended monorail in the world.

Etymology
The name of Chiba in the Japanese language is formed from two kanji characters. The first, means "thousand" and the second,  means "leaves". The name was adopted by a branch of the Taira clan, which moved to the area in present-day Chiba City in the late Heian period. The branch of the Taira adopted the name and became the Chiba clan, which held strong influence over the area of the prefecture until the Azuchi–Momoyama period.

History

Early history
The first records related to the city of Chiba record the emigration of Taira Tsuneshige (1083?–1088), a powerful bushi warlord of the late Heian period, to Shimōsa Province, which historically occupied the north of Chiba Prefecture. Tsuneshige was appointed as gunji administrator of Sōma District, but was transferred to the same position in Chiba District two years later. Here he proclaimed himself , became a kokushi governor of the province, and used the area around present-day Chiba City as a power base to rule over Shimōsa Province, Kazusa Province, as well as establish himself as a military force in the Kantō region. Tsuneshige's son,  (1118–1201) was instrumental in aiding Minamoto no Yoritomo (1147–1199) with the establishment of the Kamakura shogunate. Tsuneshige built a spacious residence and numerous temples in present-day Chiba City, and in the same period he transferred his power base from Ōji Castle to Inohana Castle on Mount Inohana. The area of present-day Chiba City became jōkamachi , or castle town, and prospered under the Chiba clan. The clan's power extended in the region until the Muromachi period.

Medieval period
The Chiba clan's power and influence declined because of wars around the Kantō region during the Nanboku-chō and Muromachi periods. In the 16th century, instead of the Chiba clan, the Hara clan, which was one of the servants of Chiba clan, wielded power in this region. In the Sengoku period, the Hara clan was forcibly removed by Ashikaga Yoshiaki (足利義明, not to be confused with 足利義昭). Then, Ashikaga Yoshiaki was also removed by the Sakai (酒井 not to be confused with the Sakai clan in Mikawa) clan, which was one of the servants of the Satomi (里見) clan. Finally both the Chiba and Sakai clans were annihilated by Toyotomi Hideyoshi.

Later history
A part of the area was also governed directly by the Tokugawa Bakufu. The Oyumi clan governed their territory stably. On the other hand, according to the Sakura clan, from the beginning of the Edo period, changed governors frequently, including Takeda Nobuyoshi, Matsudaira Tadateru, and Doi Toshikatsu. Finally the Hotta clan stabilized the governance of their territory. Chiba prospered in this period as a  post-town of the Tokugawa shogunate.

Modern history
After the Meiji Restoration in 1868 and the advent of the railroad in Japan, Chiba became the political, economic, and cultural capital of Chiba Prefecture. The town of Chiba was established within Chiba District with the creation of the municipalities system on April 1, 1889. Chiba City formed on January 1, 1921. Numerous small villages and towns were merged into the previous , a process that continued until 1944. Large-scale land reclamation added to the area of the city throughout the 20th century. The city was a major center of military production leading up to World War II, and as such, was a target of aerial bombing by the United States. The city was almost completely destroyed by the end of the war. Post-war industrialization led to the city becoming a major part of the Keiyō Industrial Zone. Chiba became a Designated City of Japan on April 1, 1992.

Demographics
Per Japanese census data, Chiba's population has expanded significantly over the past 70 years.

As of February 2016, the city had an estimated population of 972,861 and a population density of 3,580 persons per km2. There were 19,135 registered foreign residents in the city as of March 31, 2007, constituting about 2% of the total population. It is the 13th most populous city in Japan as of 2022.

Politics and government

Chiba was governed by Keiichi Tsuruoka, an independent (elected with support of LDP and Kōmeitō), until May 1, 2009. He was arrested in April 2009 during a corruption investigation by the Tokyo Metropolitan Police. He was succeeded by Toshihito Kumagai of the DPJ, who won election in June 2009.

The city assembly has 54 elected members.

Wards

Chiba has six wards (ku):
 Chūō-ku – administrative center
 Hanamigawa-ku
 Inage-ku
 Midori-ku
 Mihama-ku
 Wakaba-ku

Climate
Chiba has a humid subtropical climate (Köppen climate classification Cfa) with hot summers and cool to mild winters. Precipitation is significant throughout the year, but is somewhat lower in winter.

Culture
One of the many points of interest is the Experimental Station for Landscape Plants.

Facilities
 Chiba Zoo
 Makuhari Messe

Park
 Chiba Park

Sports

Chiba plays host to the annual International Chiba Ekiden and the Chiba International Cross Country takes place just outside the city. Chiba Velodrome is located within the city. It also hosts the Bridgestone Open golf tournament.

Chiba is home to several professional sports teams, most notably:

Transportation

Airports
There is no commercial airport within city limits. Narita International Airport and Tokyo International Airport (Haneda) are the closest major airports.

Railway

The Chiba Urban Monorail runs through Chiba City. The major intercity railway stations are Chiba Station, (Sobu Line, Sotobō Line, Uchibo Line, Sōbu Main Line, Narita Line, transfer for Chiba Urban Monorail), Keisei Chiba Station (Keisei Chiba Line), and Soga Station, (Keiyō Line, Sotobō Line, Uchibo Line) all in Chūō-ku.

Highway
 Higashi-Kantō Expressway to Tokyo, Narita and Kashima
 Tateyama Expressway to Kisarazu
 Keiyō Road
 Chiba-Tōgane Road (Japan National Route 126
 Japan National Route 14
 Japan National Route 16
 Japan National Route 51
 Japan National Route 128
 Japan National Route 357

Education

Colleges and universities
 Chiba University
 Chiba Prefectural University of Health Sciences
 Kanda University of International Studies
 Tokyo Dental College
 Shukutoku University
 Keiai University
 Chiba Keizai University
 Tokyo University of Information Sciences
 The Open University of Japan
 Uekusa University
 Teikyo Heisei University (Chiba campus)
 Chiba Meitoku College
 Japan Christian Junior College

High schools
Chiba has 20 public high schools operated by the Chiba Prefectural Board of Education and two public high schools operated by the Chiba City Board of Education, including Inage Senior High School. There are also nine private high schools, including the Makuhari Junior and Senior High School.

Elementary and middle schools
Chiba has 114 public and one private elementary school and 59 public and one private middle school.

International schools
Chiba Korean Primary and Junior High School

Hospitals and clinics
 Chiba Kaihin Hospital (Mihama-ku)
 Chiba University Hospital (Chuo-ku)
 Kashiwado Hospital (Chuo-ku)
 Tokyo Dental College Chiba Hospital (Mihama-ku)
 Koizumi Clinic (Hanamigawa-ku)
 Mizuno Clinic (Hanamigawa-ku)
 Hirayama Hospital (Hanamigawa-ku)

International relations

Twin towns – sister cities

Chiba is twinned with:
 North Vancouver, Canada (1970)
 Asunción, Paraguay (1970)
 Houston, United States (1972)
 Quezon City, Philippines (1972)
 Minneapolis, United States (1986)
 Düsseldorf, Germany (2019)

Friendship cities
 Tianjin, China (1986)
 Montreux, Switzerland (1996)
 Wujiang (Suzhou), China (1996)

Notable people

 Sawa Ishige, born in Shizuoka but moved to Chiba
 Ryuta Kawashima, born in Chiba in 1959
 Masaki Aiba, of Arashi (born in Chiba in 1982) 
 Pata, of X Japan and Ra:IN
 Yukihiro of L'Arc-en-Ciel, from Chiba and a graduate of The Chiba University of Commerce
 Tomohisa Yamashita, of NEWS (Originally from Funabashi, Chiba)
 Naohito Fujiki, Japan Academy Prize-winning actor (Originally from Kurashiki, Okayama)
 Natsuki Mizu, top star of Snow Troupe in the Takarazuka Revue (born in Chiba in 1972)
 Daiki Arioka, of Hey! Say! JUMP
 Shiho Fujita, better known as Sifow
 Mirei Kiritani, actress, model, news anchor
 Kentaro Miura, creator of Berserk (born in Chiba in 1966)
 Tsukasa Fushimi, creator of Oreimo (born in Chiba in 1981)
 Susumu Tadakuma, prominent electrical engineer and professor (retired) at Chiba Institute of Technology
 Tao Okamoto, model (Originally from Ichikawa, Chiba)
 Rena Kato, formerly of AKB48
 Reina Fujie, formerly of NMB48
 Cho Chikun, Go-player and Honorable citizen of Chiba City (1996).
Shiina Natsukawa, pop idol and member of girl group TrySail
Mitsuhiro Hidaka, rapper and member of co-ed group AAA
Kenta Yamashita, racing driver
Seiji Ara, racing driver
Daiki Hashimoto, men's artistic gymnast, all-around champion at the 2020 Summer Olympics (born in Narita, but resides in Chiba)
Wataru Watari, creator of My Youth Romantic Comedy Is Wrong, As I Expected (born and currently resides in Chiba)

See also

References

External links

Official website 

 
Cities in Chiba Prefecture
Port settlements in Japan
Populated coastal places in Japan
Cities designated by government ordinance of Japan